The Rockford Park District was formed in 1909 and is governed by an elected five-member
board of commissioners who serve six-year terms without compensation. It is the third largest municipal park system in Illinois, serving the communities of Rockford, Illinois, including Loves Park, Cherry Valley, New Milford, and adjacent unincorporated areas of Boone County and Winnebago County. The District serves a population of 208,132 with 84,083 households residing within the Park District boundaries. The Rockford Park District has twice been awarded the prestigious National Gold Medal for excellence in parks and recreation management, and is a Distinguished Agency, professionally accredited for high standards and superior services.

External links 
• Rockford Park District Website

References 

Geography of Rockford, Illinois
Park districts in Illinois
Protected areas of Winnebago County, Illinois
Protected areas of Boone County, Illinois
1909 establishments in Illinois